Eddie Henderson (born October 26, 1940) is an American jazz trumpet and flugelhorn player. He came to prominence in the early 1970s as a member of pianist Herbie Hancock's Mwandishi band, going on to lead his own electric/fusion groups through the decade. Henderson earned his medical degree and worked a parallel career as a psychiatrist and musician, turning back to acoustic jazz by the 1990s.

Family influence and early music history
Henderson was born in New York City on October 26, 1940. At the age of nine he was given an informal lesson by Louis Armstrong, and he continued to study the instrument as a teenager in San Francisco, where he grew up, after his family moved there in 1954, at the San Francisco Conservatory of Music.

Henderson was influenced by the early fusion work of jazz musician Miles Davis, who was a friend of his parents. They met in 1957 when Henderson was aged seventeen.

After completing his medical education, Henderson went back to the Bay area for his medical internship and residency. It was a week-long gig with Herbie Hancock's Mwandishi band that led to a three-year job, lasting from 1970 to 1973.  In addition to the three albums recorded by the group under Hancock's name, Henderson recorded his first two albums, Realization (1972) and Inside Out (1973), with Hancock and the Mwandishi group.

After leaving Hancock, the trumpeter worked extensively with Pharoah Sanders, Mike Nock, Norman Connors, and Art Blakey's Jazz Messengers, returning to the San Francisco Bay Area in 1975 where he joined the Latin-jazz group Azteca, and fronted his own bands. While he gained some recognition for his work with the Herbie Hancock Sextet (1970–1973), his own records were considered too "commercial".

Medical career
After three years in the Air Force, Henderson enrolled at the University of California, Berkeley, graduating with a B.S. in zoology in 1964. He then studied medicine at Howard University in Washington D.C., graduating in 1968. Though he undertook his residency in psychiatry, he practiced general medicine.

Personal life
Eddie Henderson is married to Natsuko Henderson and his daughter, Cava Menzies, is a musician and educator. Both his wife and daughter contribute compositions to his albums.

UK success
Henderson's only UK hit was the single "Prance On" recorded for Capitol which reached No. 44 in the UK Singles Chart in November 1978.

Discography

As leader 
 Realization (Capricorn, 1973)
 Inside Out (Capricorn, 1974) – recorded in 1973
 Sunburst (Blue Note, 1975)
 Heritage  (Blue Note, 1976)
 Comin' Through (Capitol, 1977)
 Mahal (Capitol, 1978)
 Runnin' to Your Love (Capitol, 1979)
 Phantoms (SteepleChase, 1989)
 Think On Me (SteepleChase, 1990) – recorded in 1989
 Colors of Manhattan with Laurent De Wilde (Gazebo, 1990)
 Flight of Mind (SteepleChase, 1991)
 Manhattan in Blue (Videoarts, 1994)
 Inspiration (Milestone, 1995) – recorded in 1994
 Tribute to Lee Morgan with Joe Lovano, Cedar Walton, Grover Washington Jr. (NYC, 1995) – recorded in 1994
 Dark Shadows (Milestone, 1996)
 Dreams of Gershwin (Videoarts, 1998)
 Reemergence (Sharp Nine, 1999)
 Oasis (Sirocco, 2001)
 So What (Eighty-Eight's, 2002)
 Time & Spaces (Sirocco, 2004)
 Echoes (Marge, 2004)
 Precious Moment (Kind of Blue, 2006)
 For All We Know (Furthermore, 2010)
 Collective Portrait (Smoke Sessions, 2015)
 Be Cool (Smoke Sessions, 2018)
 Shuffle and Deal (Smoke Sessions, 2020)

As sideman 

With Kenny Barron
 Live at Fat Tuesdays  (Enja, 1988)
 Quickstep (Enja, 1991)
 Things Unseen (Gitanes Jazz, 1997)
 Spirit Song (Verve, 2000)

With Gary Bartz
 Dance of Magic (Cobblestone, 1975)
 Music Is My Sanctuary (Capitol, 1977)
 Reflections On Monk (SteepleChase, 1989)
 The Red and Orange Poems (Atlantic, 1994)

With Norman Connors
 Dance of Magic (Cobblestone, 1972)
 Dark of Light (Cobblestone, 1973)
 Love from the Sun (Buddah, 1973)
 Slew Foot (Buddah, 1974)
 Saturday Night Special (Buddah, 1975)
 Invitation (Arista, 1979)

With The Cookers
 Warriors (Jazz Legacy Productions, 2010)
 Cast The First Stone (Plus Loin Music/Harmonia Mundi, 2011)
 Believe (Motéma Music, 2012)
 Time And Time Again (Motéma Music, 2014)
 The Call Of The Wild And Peaceful Heart (Smoke Sessions, 2016)
 Look Out! (Gearbox, 2021)

With Stanley Cowell
 Talkin' 'Bout Love (Galaxy, 1977)
 New World (Galaxy, 1981)
 Setup (SteepleChase, 1994)

With Richard Davis
 Fancy Free (Galaxy, 1977)
 Way Out West (Muse, 1980)

With Charles Earland
 Leaving This Planet (Prestige, 1974)
 The Dynamite Brothers (Prestige, 1974)

With Ilhan Ersahin
 She Said (Pozitif Muzik Yapim 1996)
 Silver (Nublu, 2019)

With Joe Farnsworth
 Beautiful Friendship (Criss Cross, 1998)
 The Good Life (Smoke Sessions, 2010)

With Benny Golson
 I Remember Miles (Alfa, 1993)
 Terminal 1 (Concord Jazz, 2004)
 New Time, New 'Tet (Concord Jazz, 2009)

With Herbie Hancock
 Mwandishi (Warner Bros. 1971)
 Crossings (Warner Bros. 1972)
  Sextant (Columbia, 1973)
 V.S.O.P. (Columbia, 1977)
 Gershwin's World (Verve, 1998)

With Billy Harper
 Destiny Is Yours (SteepleChase, 1990)
 Live on Tour in the Far East (SteepleChase, 1992)
 Live on Tour in the Far East Vol. 2  (SteepleChase, 1993)
 Somalia (Omagatoki/Evidence, 1994)
 Live on Tour in the Far East Vol. 3 (SteepleChase, 1995)
 If Our Hearts Could Only See (DIW, 1997)
 Soul of an Angel (Metropolitan, 2000)

With Billy Hart
 Enchance (Horizon, 1977)
 Rah (Gramavision, 1988)

With Willie Jones III
 Groundwork (WJ3, 2015)
 My Point Is... (WJ3, 2017)

With Jarek Smietana
 Live at the Jazz Jamboree (GOWI, 1996)
 Autumn Suite (JSR, 2006)

With Buddy Terry
 Lean On Him (Mainstream, 1972)
 Pure Dynamite (Mainstream, 1972)

With Gerald Wilson
 New York, New Sound (Mack Avenue, 2003)
 In My Time (Mack Avenue, 2005)

With Pete Yellin
 Dance of Allegra (Mainstream, 1972)
 Mellow Soul (Metropolitan, 1998)

With others
 Mina Aoe, The Shadow of Love (Victor, 1993)
 Dale Barlow, Hipnotation (Scratch, 1991)
 Bill Barron, Higher Ground (Joken, 1993)
 T. K. Blue, Another Blue (Arkadia Jazz, 1999) – recorded in 1998
 Donald Brown, Sources of Inspiration (Muse, 1990) – recorded in 1989
 George Cables, Morning Song (HighNote. 2003) – live recorded in 1980
 Joe Chambers, Mirrors (Blue Note, 1998)
 Jimmy Cobb, Remembering Miles (Eighty-Eight's, 2011)
 Michael Davis, Trumpets Eleven (Hip-Bone, 2003)
 Steve Davis, Say When (Smoke Sessions, 2015)
 Laurent de Wilde, Off the Boat (Ida, 1988)
 Dilba, Dilba (WEA, 1996)
 Will Downing, A Dream Fulfilled (Island, 1991)
 Ray Drummond, Maya's Dance (Nilva, 1989)
 Pete Escovedo & Sheila Escovedo, Happy Together (Fantasy, 1978)
 Sonny Fortune, From Now On (Blue Note, 1996)
 Rick Germanson, Live at Smalls (SmallsLIVE, 2011)
 Winard Harper, Be Yourself (Epicure, 1994)
 Kevin Hays, Sweet Ear (SteepleChase, 1991)
 Bertha Hope, Elmo's Fire (SteepleChase, 1991)
 J. J. Johnson, The Brass Orchestra (Verve, 1997)
 Azar Lawrence, Mystic Journey (Furthermore, 2010)
 The Leaders, Spirits Alike (Double Moon, 2006)
 Victor Lewis, Know It Today, Know It Tomorrow (Red 1993)
 Bennie Maupin, Slow Traffic to the Right (Mercury, 1977)
 Ron McClure, Never Forget (SteepleChase, 1991)
 Mingus Big Band, Live in Tokyo (Sunnyside, 2006)
 Butch Morris, Nublu Orchestra Conducted by Butch Morris (Nublu, 2006)
 Mulgrew Miller, Hand in Hand (BMG/RCA, 1993)
 Nicholas Payton, Lew Soloff, Tom Harrell, Eddie Henderson, Trumpet Legacy (Milestone, 1998)
 Courtney Pine, Modern Day Jazz Stories (Antilles, 1995)
 Martha Reeves, Gotta Keep Moving (Fantasy, 1980)
 Justin Robinson, Just in Time (Verve, 1992)
 Pharoah Sanders, Journey to the One (Theresa, 1980)
 Sonny Simmons, Mixolydis (Marge, 2002)
 Archie Shepp, Something to Live For (Timeless, 1997)
 Bill Stewart, Snide Remarks (Blue Note, 1995)
 John Thompson, Romantic Night (AMH 2002)
 McCoy Tyner,  Journey (Verve/Birdology 1993)
 Roseanna Vitro, Catchin' Some Rays (Telarc, 1997)
 Mal Waldron, My Dear Family (Alfa, 1994)
 Tim Warfield, Spherical (Criss Cross, 2015)
 Grover Washington Jr., All My Tomorrows (Columbia, 1994)
 Wax Poetic, Three (Doublemoon, 1998)
 Buster Williams, Dreams Come True (Buddah, 1980)
 Lenny Williams, Rise Sleeping Beauty (Motown, 1975)
 Leon Thomas Precious Energy (Mapleshade, 1990)
 Denny Zeitlin, Invasion of the Body Snatchers (United Artists, 1978)

References

External links

Eddie Henderson Interview NAMM Oral History Library (2020)

1940 births
Living people
Jazz musicians from California
Musicians from the San Francisco Bay Area
21st-century American male musicians
21st-century trumpeters
Alessa Records artists
Blue Note Records artists
Capitol Records artists
Milestone Records artists
SteepleChase Records artists
American jazz flugelhornists
American jazz trumpeters
American male trumpeters
Jazz-funk trumpeters
American male jazz musicians
San Francisco Conservatory of Music alumni
University of Hartford Hartt School faculty
The Leaders members
WJ3 Records artists
Smoke Sessions Records artists